The 1920 VMI Keydets football team represented the Virginia Military Institute (VMI) in their 30th season of organized football, during the 1920 college football season. Led by first-year head coach Blandy Clarkson, the Keydets went 9–0 and outscored opponents 431 to 20. College Football Hall of Fame inductee Jimmy Leech starred on the team, leading the nation in scoring with 210 points. Leech was selected third-team All-America by Walter Camp. The season included the first instance of the rivalry with The Citadel, which would later become known as the Military Classic of the South. The team was nicknamed "The Flying Squadron."

Schedule

References

VMI
VMI Keydets football seasons
South Atlantic Intercollegiate Athletic Association football champion seasons
College football undefeated seasons
VMI Keydets football